The Norma M20-FC is a sports prototype race car, designed, developed and produced by French constructor Norma, and specifically built to FIA Group CN specification, to compete in sports car racing and hillcimb events, since 2011.

References

Sports prototypes
M20-FC